Annunciation Seminary was a Roman Catholic seminary in Bailu, Pengzhou, Sichuan, China. The seminary was operated by French missionaries from 1908 to 1949 and is one of the largest French-styled church complexes in Sichuan.

Following the departure of the French missionaries in 1949, the seminary complex was eventually abandoned. However, it was later named a Major Historical and Cultural Site Protected at the National Level of China, and despite being damaged in the 2008 Sichuan earthquake, it was restored by 2016.

Naming 
The seminary is known in many different names across several languages. The Latin name "Seminarium Annuntiationis" is inscribed at the entrance of the building. In his 1917 book , J.-M. Planchet called the seminary the "", distinguishing it from the other seminary in Pengzhou for younger students, which he called the "". In Chinese, the seminary site is known as Ling Bao Xiu Yuan ('Annunciation Seminary') or Shang Shu Yuan.

History 
The French Catholic presence in Sichuan began when the Papacy entrusted the Paris Foreign Missions Society to evangelize the province in 1753. The French priest Marie-Julien Dunand, who was the Apostolic Vicar of Sichuan, planned for a regional seminary in the countryside after an anti-missionary riot broke out in Chengdu in 1895.

The construction of the seminary complex began in 1895 and was overseen by the French priest Alexandre Perrodin. Local architects and workers participated in building the seminary, and it was completed in 1908.

J.-M. Planchet, in his 1917 book , referred to the seminary as the "" of the Apostolic Vicariate of Northwestern Sichuan. According to Planchet, Perrodin headed the seminary, which also had two Chinese leaders, Irénée Ouang and André Tong. Perrodin died in China in 1933.

After the founding of the People's Republic of China in 1949, the French missionaries left and the seminary ceased its operations.

Architecture

Before the People's Republic of China

Construction 
The complex was divided into five distinct areas, which included the chapel, west, south, north, and east sides, with the east side building featuring three floors and the remaining three sides consisting of two floors each. The chapel was centrally located on the western side of the complex.

According to Gao Wei, the seminary complex was constructed using a combination of brick and wood materials. The walls were built by local bricks, but the beams, columns and other components were made of wood. The complex's roof was built in the chuandou structural system. The exterior of the chapel was made of marble and plastered white. Local workers in 2017 asserted that the marble and stained glass of the chapel were brought from France. 

According to Gao Wei, the complex was a blend of Chinese and western architectural styles. The four sides of the seminary were in traditional Chinese style. However, the chapel was neo-Gothic, and the pillars of the seminary complex were neo-Romanesque.

Mudslide damage 
In the early 20th century, the upper seminary's west side and the backside of the chapel were damaged by a mudslide. The exact year of the mudslide is uncertain, with some sources reporting it to be 1928 while others suggest it occurred in 1934.

During the People's Republic of China 

Following the departure of the French missionaries, the seminary ceased its operations, but its subsequent history is subject to differing accounts. According to China Daily, the building was used as a local elementary school campus, an office building, a storehouse, and a hospital. Gao Wei, on the other hand, asserted that no one used the building after the elementary school moved out in 1951. Aurore Staiger from Historia magazine claimed that the seminary was briefly used to house the elderly in 1949 before the government shut down the site in 1950. Despite these variations, all sources agree that the site eventually fell into abandonment.

In 1989, the building was listed as a county-level protected cultural site. 

In 2003, a report from China Daily stated that the local Catholic church had assigned locals to maintain the building while allowing them to grow corn on the grounds of the campus. In 2004, the site's protection level was raised to the province-level. In May 2006, it was registered as a Major Historical and Cultural Site Protected at the National Level of China.

2008 Sichuan earthquake 
Most of the seminary complex collapsed during the earthquake on May 12, 2008. According to witnesses, when the earthquake happened, there were couples posing for wedding photos at the site. The site collapsed eight to ten seconds after the earthquake started, but no one was injured. 

In late May 2008, the National Cultural Heritage Administration surveyed the cultural heritage sites in Sichuan and appointed Beijing Institute of Ancient Architecture to assist the restoration of the seminary. In June 2008, Sichuan Provincial Cultural Heritage Administration confirmed the decision to rebuild the seminary complex. The Chinese State Council mentioned the seminary in the "Cultural and Natural Heritage" section of a notice it issued in September 2008 regarding restoration and reconstruction efforts after the earthquake.

In an interview in June 2008, the head of Beijing Institute of Ancient Architecture, Han Yang, considered it "difficult" to rebuild the seminary complex. In 2009, he conducted a comprehensive study of the architecture of the seminary before the earthquake, the impact of the earthquake, and potential methods of restoration.

Reconstruction 

According to Gao Wei, reconstruction of the building commenced in 2009 and was completed in 2016. The process was impeded by the loss of the original design and blueprints from the French. Despite this setback, the restored complex retains a similar exterior appearance, structure, and floor plan to the original design, though different materials were used. The four sides were rebuilt in steel-concrete composite structures.

The chapel was rebuilt differently than it was first built. It was reconstructed with a steel roof but without the original crosses. The stained glass was replaced with PVC, and the rib vaults were replaced with cloister vaults. The decorative element on the ceiling was also not restored, and the top of the chapel towers was redesigned.

However, during the reconstruction, the part of the chapel buried in the 1934 mudslide was cleaned and excavated. It is then preserved and incorporated as a part of the restored chapel.

According to Aurore Staiger, Tang Ming, the grandson of a priest who once served at the seminary, discovered many artifacts related to the seminary, including the altar which had been stolen and sold multiple times. As of 2016, Tang Ming was working for Pengzhou's heritage protection services, and he stored the collected artifacts in a room in the restored site.

As of 2019, it remains unclear what purpose the rebuilt seminary complex will serve in the future. Gao Wei suggested that the complex could be turned into a cultural and recreational center, a philanthropic educational center, a historical museum, or return to its religious purposes.

Notable people

Alumni 
 , a Sichuan priest ordained in 1948. In November 1950, Wang published a Declaration of Self-Reliance and Reform that called to "sever all ties with imperialism" and echoed Three-Self sentiments. He then became a member of the 6th–8th Chinese People's Political Consultative Conference and vice chairman of the 3rd–6th Catholic Patriotic Association of China. He was also the 1st–3rd chairman of

Cultural influences 
 The Chinese poet Zhong Ming mentioned Annunciation Seminary in his poem "Stay Overnight in Bailu Town".

See also 
 Catholic Church in Sichuan

References

Citations

External links 
 Annunciation Seminary's page from Sichuan Provincial Cultural Heritage Administration 

Churches in Chengdu
Roman Catholic churches in Sichuan
Gothic Revival church buildings in Sichuan
Romanesque Revival church buildings in China
Former Catholic seminaries
Catholic seminaries in Asia
Seminaries and theological colleges in China
1908 establishments in China
Major National Historical and Cultural Sites in Sichuan
Pengzhou